The Caudron C.280 Phalène ("Moth") was a civil utility aircraft built in France during the 1930s.  It was a high-wing braced monoplane of conventional configuration with fixed tailskid undercarriage.  The pilot and two-three passengers were accommodated within an enclosed cabin.  The structure was wooden throughout, with the forward fuselage skinned with plywood, and the rest of the aircraft fabric-covered.

The type proved popular on the civil market, with a number of long-distance flights staged to promote it. The French military also purchased a number of examples under the C.400 and C.410 designations. The Caudron C.286 that ended up in the Second Spanish Republic was captured by the nationalist faction and used as liaison aircraft during the Spanish Civil War.

Variants

 C.280 - Initial version, powered by  Salmson 9Nc radial engine. Five built. 
 C.280/6 Phalène - Revised tail, Salmson 9Nc engine. One built.
Three built.
 C.282 Phalène - Powered by a  Renault 4Pci engine. 11 built.
 C.282/2 Phalène IV -  Powered by a  Renault 4Pdi engine. 21 built.
 C.282/3 Phalène - based on C.282 with reduced fuel and Renault 4Pdi engine. One built.
 C.282/4 Super Phalène - fitted with dual controls, automatic slots and flaps, with Renault 4Pdi engine. Ten built.
 C.282/7 Super Phalène - Renault 4Pdi engine. One built.
 C.282/8 - Major production version, with stretched fuselage and more fuel. Powered by Renault 4Pdi engine. 89 built. equipped with a 108 kW (145 hp) Renault 4Pdi piston engine.
 C282/9 -  Renault 4Pei. Six built.
 C.282/10 - Equipped with the Merville series 601 propeller and powered by Renault 4Pei. Ten built.
 C.286 Phalène VI - Powered by a  de Havilland Gipsy III engine. One built.
 C.286/2 Phalène VI - Powered by  de Havilland Gipsy Major I and fitted with rounded wingtips. Eleven built.
 C.286/2S4 Super Phalène and C.286/3S4 Super Phalène' - Special luxury versions, powered by the de Havilland Gipsy Major I engine. Three built.
 C.282/4 Super Phalène - Modified tail as per C.280/6. Gipsy Major I. Five built.
 C.286/5 Super-Phalène - Modified wings and tail. Gipsy Major I. One built.
 C.286/6 Super-Phalène - Based on C.286/5 with Merville 501 propeller. Five built.
 C.286/7 Super-Phalene - equipped with Ratier series 1175 variable-pitch propeller. (Eight built)
 C.286/8 Super-Phalène - The fuselage was lengthened slightly, it was powered by a de Havilland Gipsy Major piston engine. (Four built)
 C.286/9 Super-Phalene - The fuselage was slightly shorter. (One built)
 C.289/2 -Powered by a 112 kW (150 hp) Hispano-Suzia 5Q radial piston engine. (Five built)
 C.400 -  Military version. 40 were built for the French Air Force.
 C.401 - Several C.400s were modified for civilian use during the postwar years.
 C.410 - Military version, powered by a 104-kW (140-hp) Renault 4Pdi piston engine. (11 built)

Operators

Force Publique

French Air Force

 Civil operator - Aero Club of Lithuania - 1 aircraft

 Civil operator - Caudron C.286 registered EC-ZZZ

Nationalist Spanish Air Force

Specifications (C.282/6)

References

 
 
 aviafrance.com

1930s French civil utility aircraft
C.280
High-wing aircraft
Single-engined tractor aircraft
Aircraft first flown in 1932